Bab Idriss Square is a square in downtown Beirut, Lebanon.

Overview
Bab Idriss was one of the main entrances to Beirut's city center, and a popular destination until 1975. With the reconstruction, it was designed as a new square.

Construction
Once the souks of Beirut were built at the turn of the 19th century, the role of Bab Idriss developed. It was an important transport hub and a popular destination. During the French Mandate, Abdel Hamid Karameh Street was connected to Bab Idriss. A square was planned at that location but never built. Post-war reconstruction of the mid-1990s offered the opportunity to achieve this, reinforcing Bab Idriss’s role as the western gateway to Beirut’s historic core.

History
Bab refers to an ancient gate and Idriss to the family owning property at the crossroads since the 19th century. Although not always a gate, Bab Idriss remained one in popular memory, and was one of the main entrances to the city center.
In Roman times, a colonnaded street was located in this area, and connected the city center of Berytus to the Hippodrome in Wadi Abu Jamil. Later, the city wall blocked this main street. With the construction of the souks of Beirut at the turn of the 19th century, the role of Bab Idriss developed. Two tramway lines made it an important transport hub and a popular destination: the ABC store, Patisserie Suisse, Café Tanios, Cosmos Restaurant and Librairie Antoine were among its memorable venues. During the French Mandate, Abdel Hamid Karameh Street - one of the streets radiating from Etoile Square – was connected to Bab Idriss. There, a square was planned but never built. Post-war reconstruction of the mid-1990s offered the opportunity to achieve this, reinforcing Bab Idriss's role as the western gateway to Beirut’s historic core. Today, Bab Idriss Square is framed by the restored Tanios and Sabbag buildings to the north, and on its southern side by the ABC and Kronfol-Daouk buildings. The latter was dismantled and reconstructed to make way for wider roads. On its eastern side, the square is dominated by the new Idriss building.

Timeline
Roman era: Colonnaded street connected the city center of Berytus to the Hippodrome in Wadi Abu Jamil.

19th century: Role of Bab Idriss developed after the construction of the souks of Beirut.

French Mandate: Abdel Hamid Karameh Street, radiating from Etoile Square was connected to Bab Idriss.

Mid-1990s: Post-war reconstruction offered the opportunity to build a square.

See also
Bab (disambiguation)
Wadi Abu Jamil

References
Davie, May (2001) Beyrouth, 1825 – 1975 Un siècle et demi d’urbanisme, Ordre des ingénieurs et des architectes, Beyrouth.
Kassir, Samir (2003) Histoire de Beyrouth, Fayard, Paris.

Monuments and memorials in Lebanon
Squares in Beirut